Anachis roberti is a species of sea snail in the family Columbellidae, the dove snails.

References

 Monsecour, K. & Monsecour, D., 2006. - Two new deep water species of Columbellidae (Gastropoda: Neogastropoda) from the Caribbean. Gloria Maris 45(1-2): 1–6

roberti
Gastropods described in 2006